Carla Renata (sometimes credited as Carla Renata Williams) is an American actress and singer. She was born in Cherry Point, North Carolina and grew up in St. Louis, Missouri. Renata has starred in several long-running Broadway musicals, national tours, and appears on television shows. She is creator and host of The Curvy Critic with Carla Renata which streams via YouTube and Facebook Live.

Biography

Carla Renata graduated from Howard University with a B.A. in Broadcast Production and was cast in the Matthew Broderick Broadway revival of How to Succeed in Business Without Really Trying. She has worked in Broadway musicals. The Life, Smokey Joe's Cafe and in Vegas for the rock group Queen as "Killer Queen" in their hit musical We Will Rock You. 
She made history becoming the 1st African American actress to secure recurring roles on four television shows  - TWICE: Shake It Up, Hart of Dixie, How to Live With Your Parents, Mr. Box Office and Superstore.

She is best known for her roles in Avenue Q, Smokey Joe's Cafe on Broadway.

The New York Times called her an "Energizer Bunny of a comedian with a big ponytail, giant hoop earrings and an impressive résumé" and cites her vocalism and style as ranging from "quasi-operatic" to gospel and rock.  The NAACP Theatre Awards nominated her performance for being outstanding in the Los Angeles production of The Lion King as Shenzi.

Broadway credits
The Lion King Original Los Angeles Production
How to Succeed in Business Without Really Trying
Avenue Q – Gary Coleman
The Life
Smokey Joe's Café

Off-Broadway
 Back to Bacharach and David – soloist

Film
 Latte & the Magic Waterstone - Boar's Mother

TV credits
 According to Jim - Sherri (2 episodes) 
 Anger Management – Angelina (1 episode)
 Bones – Maureen Mack (1 episode)
 CSI: Crime Scene Investigation – Devine (1 episode)
 Hart of Dixie – Susie / Zombie No. 6 (19 episodes)
 How to Live With Your Parents – Mrs. Fogelman (2 episodes)
 It's Always Sunny in Philadelphia – Police Clerk (1 episode)
 Lastman – Additional Voices (4 episodes)
 Life in Pieces – Physician's Assistant (1 episode)
 Living Biblically – Gracie (6 episodes)
 Modern Family – Nikki (1 episode)
 Mr. Box Office – Lois Yearwood (2 episodes)
 New Girl – Octopussy (1 episode)
 Shake It Up – Marcie Blue (6 episodes)
 Superstore – Janet (26 episodes)
 The Haves and the Have Nots – Joanne (2 episodes)
 The Neighbors – Leslie (1 episode)
 The Suite Life of Zack and Cody – Veronica (1 episode)
 Wabbit – Tooth Fairy (voice) / Grandma (voice) (2 episodes)
 Young & Hungry – Ms. Higgs (1 episode)
 Zoey 101 – Nurse Kafader (1 episode)

National touring credits
Avenue Q – Gary Coleman
The Who's Tommy – u/s The Acid Queen

Regional theatre credits
 Disney's The Lion King – Los Angeles production as Shenzi

Video game creditsGrand Theft Auto: Episodes from Liberty City – Lisa LynnGrand Theft Auto V – The Local PopulationKinect Disneyland Adventures –  N/AManeater – Female Hunter 4

Film creditsLatte and the Magic Waterstone'' – Boar's Mother (voice)

References

External links

Live Concert Photos
Carla Renata Website

American video game actresses
American musical theatre actresses
American television actresses
Living people
Actresses from St. Louis
Howard University alumni
People from Cherry Point, North Carolina
Year of birth missing (living people)
21st-century American women